Charles William Thomas Finney (born 5 September 1931) is an English former footballer who played in the Football League for Birmingham City, Crewe Alexandra, Queens Park Rangers, Rochdale and Stoke City.

Career
Finney was born in Stoke-on-Trent and began his career with Crewe Alexandra as an amateur before turning professional with Stoke City as an 18-year-old in 1949. He spent the first three seasons with Stoke in the reserves making his debut away at Manchester United on 11 October 1952, Finney scoring in a 2–0 victory. He scored twice in his next two matches in defeats against Portsmouth and Bolton Wanderers as Stoke went on a poor run of form which led them to being relegated to the Second Division. He scored six goals in 25 appearances during 1953–54 and was used sparingly by manager Frank Taylor in 1954–55 as Stoke narrowly missed out on promotion. Finney signed for Second Division champions Birmingham City, for whom he played in the Inter-Cities Fairs Cup. After failing to fully establish himself at St Andrew's Finney had short spells with Queens Park Rangers, Crewe Alexandra and finished his professional career at Rochdale. He later played for non-league Macclesfield Town where he scored eight goals in 32 games.

Career statistics
Source:

References

External links
 

1931 births
Living people
Footballers from Stoke-on-Trent
English footballers
Association football forwards
Crewe Alexandra F.C. players
Stoke City F.C. players
Birmingham City F.C. players
Queens Park Rangers F.C. players
Rochdale A.F.C. players
Macclesfield Town F.C. players
English Football League players